HMS Ipswich was a 70-gun third-rate ship of the line of the Royal Navy, launched at Harwich on 19 April 1694.

She was rebuilt by Joseph Allin the younger at Portsmouth according to the 1719 Establishment, relaunching on 30 October 1730. In 1743 she was part of a small three-vessel squadron sent to the Bay of Ajaccio under Vice-Admiral Thomas Mathews to investigate reports that a single Spanish ship of the line was anchored there for repairs. On reaching the Bay the squadron, comprising Ipswich,  and the fireship , encountered and overwhelmed the 70-gun Spanish warship Isidoro. The Spanish vessel was set on fire by her crew to avoid her being captured, and sank in the bay.

Ipswich was hulked in 1757, and broken up in 1764.

Notes

References
  
 Lavery, Brian (2003) The Ship of the Line - Volume 1: The development of the battlefleet 1650-1850. Conway Maritime Press. .

Ellis, C. Hamilton (n.d.)"Ships: a Pictorial History from Noah's Ark to The U.S.S> United States". Peebles Press.

Ships of the line of the Royal Navy
1690s ships
Ships built in Harwich